Ben Dearnley (born 1964) is an English sculptor. He was born in Salisbury, Wiltshire, England.

Training
In 1997 Dearnley began his training in carving stone with sculptor Les Sandham.

The 'Avenue of Champions' series
Dearnley was selected as an Official Olympic Artist for London's 2012 Olympics, and is best known for his 'Avenue of Champions' series, a collaboration with some of Britain's finest Olympic and Paralympics athletes to commemorate the 2012 Games. Athletes depicted in the series include: Mark Foster, Ade Adepitan, Debbie Flood, Alex O'Connell, Christine Ohuruogu, Lee Pearson, Louis Smith, Leon Taylor and Steve Williams.

Other work

Dearnley's other works include: a bronze portrait of violist Lionel Tertis, on permanent display at the Royal Academy of Music; a marble torso placed within London's Law Courts; and a bird sculpture on permanent show in Lake Farm Country Park in Hayes, west London.

References

1964 births
English sculptors
English male sculptors
Modern sculptors
People from Salisbury
People from Wiltshire
Living people